Kuat RZ-1 A-wing Interceptor are  starfighters in the Star Wars franchise. Designed and manufactured by the Kuat Systems Engineering, they are depicted as fast but fragile interceptors of the Rebel Alliance, conceived for high-speed surgical strikes, deep reconnaissance and escort fighter duty.

A-wings first appear in Return of the Jedi (1983) and later in numerous Star Wars materials and productions. It gained popularity through its depiction in several video games, and since 1985 the A-wing has been merchandised by several companies. They are the fastest vessels in the Star Wars canon, with the advantage of being the smallest hyperspace drive-equipped craft without relying on a carrier, allowing the vessel to extricate itself from a losing battle or escape hostile territory after performing an attack.

Appearances
RZ-1 A-wings from Green Squadron participate in the climactic Battle of Endor depicted in Return of the Jedi (1983). At Endor, an A-wing piloted by Arvel Crynyd (Hilton McRae) crashes into the bridge of the Super Star Destroyer Executor, resulting in the Executor crashing out of control into the second Death Star. In addition to McRae, two women recorded A-wing cockpit footage; one of the actors was cut, and the other was dubbed over by a male actor.

A-wings later appear in various Star Wars Expanded Universe television shows, books, and games. Some Expanded Universe material says Jan Dodonna created the A-wing based on his analysis of the role of speed in the Battle of Yavin, the climactic battle in Star Wars (1977). Later material, such as the Star Wars Rebels television series, depicts the starfighters in use before the events of Star Wars.

The A-wings of Phoenix Squadron play an important role in Rebels second season (2015–2016). Rebels producers used the A-wing in part because the ship was not used much in Return of the Jedi  The fighter's presence in the cartoon was meant to show that different groups used different craft to fight the Empire. The series's episodes "The Holocrons of Fate" and "Twin Suns" also feature the two-seater RZ-1T trainer, a training spacecraft used by the rebels to train recruits. The RZ-1T also appears in the novel Battlefront II: Inferno Squad.

The RZ-1 A-Wing is based on the R-22 A-Wing, also made by Kuat Systems Engineering
 
A later variant, the RZ-2 A-wing, features in Star Wars Battlefront II and in Star Wars: The Last Jedi. It is a bigger spacecraft used by the Resistance against the First Order.

Concept and design

The A-wing was one of two new Rebel Alliance starfighters created for Return of the Jedi. It was dubbed the A fighter because it was the first of the two designs created. Ralph McQuarrie's concept art has blue coloring, but these sections were red on the models because of bluescreen limitations.

Wesley Seeds and Lorne Peterson of Industrial Light & Magic built the model, and its pilot figure is based on a World War I German airman. A battle-damaged engine "wing" was snapped into place to represent Arvel Crynyd's damaged fighter as it crashed into the Executor.

McQuarrie's original blue-and-white coloring was used for the craft's appearance in Rebels. Photographs from the filming of Star Wars: The Last Jedi show an A-wing on the film set. Screen Rant suggests the A-wing seen in the photographs evokes some of McQuarrie's original design, such as the blaster cannon shape and the presence of additional ports in the cockpit.

Depiction 
According to Star Wars canon, the A-wing was first produced by Kuat Systems Engineering, which had built the Delta-7 starfighter for the Jedi Order.  With the Jedi eradicated (as depicted in Star Wars: Episode III – Revenge of the Sith) and the Delta-7 nearly impossible for non-Jedi to pilot, Kuat designed a new starfighter, the R-22 A-wing, in hopes the Galactic Empire would purchase it.  While impressed with prototypes of the R-22, the Empire instead went with the TIE fighter, and forbade Kuat from mass-producing the A-wing.  The prototypes were sold to the kingdom of Tammuz-an, which over a decade later were eventually sold to the Rebel Alliance. 

Rebel engineers made many alterations to the original R-22 design to produce the RZ-1 model as seen in Return of the Jedi.  The original engines were swapped out for more powerful ones, while other major components were replaced with lightweight versions so a supraluminal hyperdrive could be added.  The resulting fighter is faster than even the Empire's TIE interceptor and perfect for hit-and-run attacks, long-range patrols, and reconnaissance missions.  Its two laser cannons, mounted on special swivel mounts, can elevate or depress 60° vertically; some were modified for full 360° rotation but these had a greater chance to jam. However, engineers could not fit the A-wing with an astromech droid, which limited how many hyperspace coordinates it could carry.  The lack of droid assistance also makes it challenging even for a being with Jedi-like reflexes to control a fighter so fast and maneuverable.  Consequently, only the best Rebel pilots are allowed to fly the A-wing.

After the Empire was defeated, background material explains how Kuat Systems Engineering made a number of improvements to the design to create the RZ-2 A-wing for the New Republic Defense Fleet.  Even faster than the original, the RZ-2 requires less maintenance than the RZ-1, and the swivel mounts that allow its laser cannons to rotate 360° were no longer at risk of jamming.  Thanks to the New Republic's disarmament campaign, RZ-2s found their way into the Resistance, which like the Rebellion before allows only the best pilots to fly the A-wing.

Impact 

CinemaBlend said the A-wing received little attention after Return of the Jedi because no prominent characters pilot the craft. Kenner in 1985 released an A-wing pilot figure as part of its Power of the Force line, and it released a "magnificent" A-wing toy as part of the Star Wars: Droids line. Since then, the A-wing has been recreated as various other toys, models, and collectibles by companies that include Galoob, Hasbro, Model Products Corporation, Estes Industries, Lego, and Fantasy Flight Games.

Screen Rant said the A-wing gained popularity as a playable craft in the Star Wars: X-Wing space combat simulator (1993), which The Escapist said depicted the ship as "an excellent dogfighter". Subsequent video games that allowed players to pilot the A-wing also contributed to the ship's popularity. Blastr ranked the A-wing 16th on its list of the best Star Wars vehicles.

Prince Harry was photographed sitting in an A-wing cockpit during his and the Duke of Cambridge's April 2016 visit to the Star Wars: Episode VIII set. Responding to the photographs, various publications called the A-wing "iconic", an "unsung hero", "woefully underappreciated", and "a classic".

In 2018 a number of Star Wars starfighters - including the A-wing - had their aerodynamic abilities tested using the Autodesk Flow Design virtual wind tunnel program.  Of those starfighters tested the A-wing was among the most aerodynamic designs of all with a drag coefficient of .17, though it was still worse than the real-life example of the F-4E Phantom with a .02 rating.  These poor results were rationalized with the in-universe explanations that drag coefficient plays no role in space travel, and that Star Wars fighters can use repulsorlifts and deflector shields to give themselves better flight profiles.

References

External links
 
 
 
 
 

Star Wars spacecraft

sv:Lista över farkoster i Star Wars#A-Wing